Cabin Fever 2 is the eleventh mixtape by American rapper Wiz Khalifa, it was released on October 16, 2012. The mixtape features guest appearances from Problem, Iamsu!, Menace, Juicy J, J.R. Donato, Chevy Woods, Lavish and French Montana.

Background 
On October 19, 2012, the music video for "STU" was released. On November 1, 2012, the music video for "Tweak Is Heavy" was released. On January 18, 2013, the music video for "100 Bottles" was released.

Critical response 
Jesse Fairfax of HipHopDX said, "While not exactly pioneering anything new, Cabin Fever 2 further establishes Wiz Khalifa as a serviceable rapper aware enough to blend in with what's popular for the sake of maintaining a presence. Largely dependent on the blueprints laid by Three 6 Mafia and Lex Luger, he brings life to the typically mundane and makes up for instances such as French Montana's barely decipherable verse on "Nothin Like the Rest." In spite of his trendy one-dimensional concepts, there is ultimately redeemable art and magic to be found in Wiz's work here."

Track listing

Charts

References

2012 mixtape albums
Wiz Khalifa albums
Sequel albums
Albums produced by Juicy J